Val Staples is an American illustrator, best known as the artist of the 2002 Masters of the Universe comic and founder of the comic studio MVCreations who published the comic. Val Staples works for a variety of comic publishers including DC, Marvel and others.

References

External links
He-man.org

American comics artists
American comics writers
Comics colorists
Living people
Year of birth missing (living people)